Alfred Valentine Robinson (August 31, 1848 - August 2, 1898) was an American Major League Baseball outfielder who played for the Washington Olympics in . He was born and died in Washington, D.C.

External links

Major League Baseball outfielders
Washington Olympics players
Baseball players from Washington, D.C.
19th-century baseball players
1848 births
1898 deaths